is a Japanese former professional baseball pitcher in Japan's Nippon Professional Baseball. He played with the Chiba Lotte Marines from 2011 to 2013 and from 2015 to 2019.

External links

NPB

1989 births
Living people
People from Ōmuta, Fukuoka
Baseball people from Fukuoka Prefecture
Japanese baseball players
Nippon Professional Baseball pitchers
Chiba Lotte Marines players